The 1997 New Year Honours in New Zealand were appointments by Elizabeth II in her right as Queen of New Zealand, on the advice of the New Zealand government, to various orders and honours to reward and highlight good works by New Zealanders, and to celebrate the passing of 1996 and the beginning of 1997. They were announced on 31 December 1996.

The recipients of honours are displayed here as they were styled before their new honour.

New Zealand Order of Merit

Dame Companion (DNZM)
 Dr Ella Orr Campbell – of Palmerston North. For services to science.

Knight Companion (KNZM)
 Terence Power McLean  – of Auckland. For services to sporting journalism.
 The Honourable Peter Wilfred Tapsell  – of Rotorua. For public services, lately as Speaker of the House of Representatives.
 The Honourable Thomas Murray Thorp – of Auckland; judge of the High Court 1979–1996.

Companion (CNZM)
 Associate Professor Judith Mary Caroline Binney – of Auckland. For services to historical research.
 The Honourable David Francis Caygill – of Christchurch. For public services.
 The Honourable Warren Ernest Cooper  – of Queenstown. For public services.
 Brigadier Ian James Duthie – Brigadiers' List, New Zealand Army.
 The Honourable John Howard Falloon – of Bideford. For public services.
 The Honourable Colin Campbell Fraser – of Christchurch; judge of the High Court 1989–1996.
 Ida Margaret Gaskin – of New Plymouth. For services to education and the community.
 Donald Kent Hunn – of Ōtaki. For services as State Services Commissioner.
 Alan Ronald Kerr – of Auckland. For services to cardiothoracic surgery.
 Professor Peggy Gwendoline Koopman-Boyden – of Hamilton. For services to the elderly.
 Charles Seymour Luney  – of Christchurch. For services to the building industry and the community.
 Dr Geraldine McDonald – of Wellington. For services to educational research.
 Elizabeth Welch Orr – of Wellington. For services to education and the community.
 Dr Clive Bentley Ross – of Auckland. For services to dental surgery.
 Kuru (Te Kuru-O-Te Marama) Waaka  – of Rotorua. For services to Māori culture.

Officer (ONZM)
 Toni-Maria Allwood – of Wellington. For services to women.
 Peter Warwick Averi – of Paraparaumu. For services to music.
 Ian Hugh Boyd – of Levin. For services to athletics.
 Dr Margaret Elaine di Menna – of Hamilton. For services to microbiology.
 Elizabeth Jane Evans – of Nelson. For services to painting.
 Kerry John Everson  – of Torquay, Victoria, Australia; lately chief fire service officer, New Zealand Fire Service.
 Jacqueline Mary Fahey – of Auckland. For services to art.
 Sean Brian Thomas Fitzpatrick – of Auckland. For services to rugby.
 Ross Goodin – of Te Kauwhata. For services to viticulture.
 Elaine Clark Herbert – of Tapanui. For services to floral art.
 Bronwen Scott Holdsworth – of Te Karaka. For services to business, art and the community.
 John Virtue Ilott – of Wellington. For services to the community.
 Duane Paul Kale – of Havelock North. For services to swimming.
 Danyon Joseph Loader – of Dunedin. For services to swimming.
 Neville Epplett Lobb – of Mount Maunganui. For services to the tourism and travel industries.
 Wing Commander John Christopher Mathewson – Royal New Zealand Air Force.
 Mary Elizabeth McGiven – of Christchurch. For services to the National Council of Women.
 Stuart Ross McRobie – of Hamilton. For services to the community.
 Michael Stewart Morris – of Wellington. For services to business and the community.
 Professor George Bouet Petersen – of Dunedin. For services to the community.
 Eric Matahaere Ropiha – of Woodville. For services to racing and equestrian sport.
 Peter Webster Wilson – of Auckland. For services to tennis.

Additional
 Lieutenant Colonel Andrew John Martin – Royal New Zealand Infantry Regiment. For military operations with the United Nations Protection Force in former Yugoslavia.
 Lance Bombardier Leighton Timothy Thompson – Royal Regiment of New Zealand Artillery. For military operations with the United Nations Protection Force in former Yugoslavia.

Member (MNZM)
 Struan Robert Anderson – of Winton. For services to the community.
 Marjorie Roseanne Blythen – of Warkworth. For services to the community.
 Graham Thomas Bone – of Greymouth. For services to sport and the community.
 Zinzan Valentine Brooke – of Auckland. For services to rugby.
 Kevin James Campbell – of Wellington. For services to aircraft safety.
 Joyce Alberta Carmichael – of Riverton. For services to the community.
 Garth McMillan Cassidy – of Waipukurau. For services to transport communication.
 Robert Cooper – of Auckland. For services to the port industry.
 Anthony Robin Thomas Corcoran – of Christchurch. For services to the community.
 Ashley James McLean Crampton  – of Whangaparāoa. For services to welfare work.
 Victor Bruce Cunningham – of Mount Maunganui. For services to local government and the community.
 Lois Dorothy Daish – of Wellington. For services to the food industry.
 Dr William John Dart – of Auckland. For services to art and music.
 Emeritus Professor Paul Woodford Day – of Hamilton. For services to the community.
 Robert Knox De Castro – of Blenheim. For services to horticulture.
 Lawrence Samuel Dennis  – of Wellington. For services to tourism and the hospitality industry.
 John Burnett Dodds – of Wellington. For services to music.
 Warrant Officer Kevin John Farley – Royal New Zealand Air Force.
 Rae Margaret Frampton – of Auckland. For services to the community.
 Gary Freeman – of Sydney, Australia. For services to rugby league.
 John Joseph Lawrence Going – of Whangārei. For services to tourism.
 Michael Niko Jones – of Auckland. For services to rugby.
 June Seeta McBride – of Tauranga. For services to education and the community.
 Bernadine Mary Meech – of Pahiatua. For services to the community.
 Francis William Bruce Miller – of Christchurch. For services to the pork industry.
 Dr Peter William Moller – of Christchurch. For services to medicine.
 Dorothy Lillian Nicholls – of Eltham. For services to the community.
 Brendan McPadden O'Connor – of Wellington. For services to public speaking.
 Beryl Emma Jean Paine – of Nelson. For services to the community.
 Tangiia Nooroa Paniora – of Tauranga. For services to the community.
 Rewiti Pomare Kingi Paraone – of Auckland. For services to Māori and the community.
 Apryll Hiria Parata-Blane – of Ruatoria. For services to education.
 Valarie Winnifred Penty – of Timaru. For services to the community.
 Alan David Ralph – of Auckland. For services to the disabled.
 Lieutenant Commander Frank Rands – Royal New Zealand Navy.
 Warrant Officer Paul Andrew Rennie – Royal New Zealand Navy.
 Major David John Houghton Rhodes  – Royal Regiment of New Zealand Artillery, Territorial Force.
 Kenneth Robert Rutherford – of Alexandra. For services to cricket.
 Kevin Ryan – of Auckland. For services to the community.
 Noma Jeanne Shepherd – of Kawakawa. For services to the community.
 Bruce Cameron Smith – of Ōhaupō. For services to farming.
 John Ru Hoani Tahuri – of Rotorua. For services to the community.
 Squadron Leader Peter Dennis Wooding – Royal New Zealand Air Force.

Additional
 Chief Petty Officer Radio Supervisor Alan Clifford Belcher – Royal New Zealand Navy. For military operations with the United Nations Protection Force in former Yugoslavia.

Companion of the Queen's Service Order (QSO)

For community service
 Marguerite Brough-Rossiter – of Whakatāne.
 Ruth Catherine Lemin – of Invercargill.
 The Reverend Maliko Setu Masina – of Porirua.
 Virginia (Ginny) Margaret Radford – of Auckland.
 Lorraine Margaret Storey – of Ohinewai.
 John Adam Wilson – of Upper Hutt.

For public services
 Dr Judith Estranna Aitken – of Wellington.
 Louise Marion Carroll  – of Auckland.
 Harold James Evans  – of Christchurch.
 Rex Stratton Kirton  – of Upper Hutt.
 Dr Michael Robert Miles – of Rotorua.
 Keith Hill Mitchell – of Wellington.
 Pamela Margaret Jean Williams – of Wanganui.
 Thomas Coldham Williams  – of Masterton.

Queen's Service Medal (QSM)

For community service
 Dorothy Lila (Bonnie) Aiken – of Auckland.
 Thomas Sydney George Bentley  – of Christchurch.
 Garry Leslie Brennan  – of Auckland.
 Neva Yvonne Clarke McKenna – of Mangonui.
 Denis Ian Dove – of Oamaru.
 Grace Harriet Olive Dunsmuir – of Ngāruawāhia.
 Gloria Agnes Grattan – of Wellington.
 Beverley Bryna Holloway – of Auckland.
 Pauline Dalziel MacInnes – of Wellington.
 Tafaeafe A'aone Malifa-Poutoa  – of Lower Hutt.
 Joan Patricia Morrison – of Christchurch.
 Tui Parsons – of Blenheim.
 Colleen Frances Pobar – of Wellington.
 Hanka (Hana) Pressburg – of Wellington.
 Makerita Samau-Auta  – of Palmerston North.
 Keith Seyler – of Walton-on-Thames, Surrey, United Kingdom.
 Nita May Shannon – of Whakatāne.
 Kate Shaw – of Rotorua.
 Kathleen Nola Speir – of Tauranga.
 The Reverend Robert Alfred Spence – of Wellington.
 Jewel Sucich  – of Kaitaia.
 Kina Zoe Tangiwai Dolly Tapper – of Matamata.
 Alison Caresa Underhill – of Carterton.
 Audrey Wilson – of Dunedin.
 Stuart McGregor Wood – of Rangiora.
 The Reverend Cecil Leonard Wright – of Auckland.

For public services
 John (Jack) Alexander Adam  – of Waitakere City.
 David Aitken Alexander – of Palmerston North.
 Roger Murray Borlase  – of Nelson.
 Marilyn Bernadette Bouzaid – of Masterton.
 David Walter Charles Cooper – of Morrinsville.
 William John Deed – of Waiuku.
 Robert James Douglas  – of Hamilton.
 Ashley Brown Edwards – of North Shore City; inspector, New Zealand Police.
 Margaret Anne Faulkner – of Porirua.
 Dr Ephra Mary Garrett – of Tangimoana.
 Richard Paul Rennie Graham – of Napier; detective sergeant, New Zealand Police.
 Wallace Patrick Haumaha – of Rotorua; sergeant, New Zealand Police.
 Ruth Herbert – of Jakarta, Indonesia.
 Maurice Shaw Jones – of Dunedin.
 Margaret Annette Longuet-Higgins  – of Wellsford.
 Peter Unwin McLay – of Whakatāne.
 Dr William Grattan O'Connell – of Auckland.
 Noeline Grace Owen – of Ōtorohanga.
 Kelvin Francis (Alby) Pahl – of Murchison; chief fire officer, Murchison Volunteer Fire Brigade, New Zealand Fire Service.
 Joseph Anzac Rewi  – of Masterton.
 Niall Campbell Shepherd – of Arthur's Pass; senior constable, New Zealand Police.
 Bronte Stuart Sinclair – of Tauranga.
 Shirley Anne Slatter – of Mount Cook.
 Shirley Anne Stevenson – of Mosgiel.
 William Brian Stevenson  – of Mosgiel.
 Mark Brendan Traynor – of Wellington.
 Charles Lawrence Waters – of Christchurch.

References

New Year Honours
1997 awards
1997 in New Zealand
New Zealand awards